The concept of Melanesian socialism was first advocated by Father Walter Lini of the New Hebrides (now Vanuatu), who became the country's first Prime Minister upon its independence from France and the United Kingdom in 1980. Lini's views on socialism were inspired by Julius Nyerere's experiments in African socialism in Tanzania.

Lini believed that socialism was inherently compatible with Melanesian societies and customs, including the emphasis on communal welfare over individualism and the communal ownership and working of land. In this, Nyerere's influence is perceptible as the latter stressed the similarities between socialism and traditional African ways of life.

Lini was an Anglican priest and believed that socialism held close similarities with Christian values and sought to combine the two as part of a Melanesian way. In this sense, socialism was not to be revolutionary, but instead fully in line with ni-Vanuatu tradition.

Although he admired Nyerere and his government sought rapprochement with countries such as Cuba and Libya, Lini believed that socialism should not necessarily entail an alliance with the Soviet Union or the Eastern bloc. Indeed, he preferred for Vanuatu to remain non-aligned and to develop closer ties with its fellow Melanesian nations (such as Papua New Guinea and the Solomon Islands). In 1982, he expressed hopes for an eventual Melanesian federal union and spoke of the "renaissance of Melanesian values", including "Melanesian socialism".

Lini also noted that in traditional Melanesian societies "'[g]iving' was based on one's ability to do so. 'Receiving' was based on one's need".

In New Caledonia, the Kanak Socialist National Liberation Front (FLNKS), an alliance of pro-independence parties, advocates the implementation of socialism along with accession to sovereignty. Independent Melanesian nations (most notably Vanuatu) have expressed support for the FLNKS.

See also 

 African socialism
 Arab socialism
 Third World socialism

Bibliography 
 Huffer, Elise (1993). Grands Hommes et Petites Îles: La Politique Extérieure de Fidji, de Tonga et du Vanuatu. Paris: Orstom. .
 Denoon, Donald et al. (ed.) (1997). The Cambridge History of the Pacific Islanders. Cambridge: Cambridge University Press. .
 Linnekin, Jocelyn (1990). "The Politics of Culture in the Pacific". In Linneki, Jocelyn; Poyer, Lin (ed.). Cultural Identity and Ethnicity in the Pacific. Honolulu: University of Hawaii Press. .

Further reading 
 Premadas, Ralph R (1986). Melanesian Socialism: Vanuatu's Quest for Self-definition (Discussion Paper Series/Centre for Developing-Area Studies). McGill University.
 Lini, Walter (1980). Beyond pandemonium: From the New Hebrides to Vanuatu. Asia Pacific Books.
 Howard, Michael C. (November 1983). "The Myth of Melanesian Socialism". Labour Capital and Society. 16:2. pp. 176–203.
 Tabani, Marc (2000). "Walter Lini, la coutume de Vanuatu et le socialisme mélanésien". Journal de la Société des océanistes. 111. pp. 173–194.

 
Melanesia
Politics of Vanuatu
Political science terminology
Types of socialism